Museo civico archeologico Antonio De Nino (Italian for Antonio De Nino Archaeology Civic Museum)  is an archaeology museum in Corfinio, Abruzzo.

History

Collection

Notes

Corfinio
Museums in Abruzzo
Archaeological museums in Italy